William J. Powell (born July 14, 1960) is an American attorney who served as the United States Attorney for the Northern District of West Virginia from 2017 to 2021. Prior to assuming his current role, he was the Chief Deputy Prosecuting Attorney for the Jefferson County, West Virginia Prosecuting Attorney's Office. He was previously a member at the law firm of Jackson Kelly PLLC, where his practice focused on civil litigation and white-collar criminal law. He also previously served as an Assistant United States Attorney in the Southern District of West Virginia, where he prosecuted major fraud and violent crimes. Powell was recommended for the role of U.S. Attorney by U.S. Senator Shelley Moore Capito. On February 8, 2021, he along with 55 other Trump-era attorneys were asked to resign. Powell announced his resignation on February 10, effective February 28.

References

External links
 Biography at U.S. Attorney's Office

1960 births
Living people
Assistant United States Attorneys
People from Manhasset, New York
Salem College alumni
United States Attorneys for the Northern District of West Virginia
West Virginia University College of Law alumni
West Virginia lawyers
21st-century American lawyers